Flashes from the Archives of Oblivion is a live double album released in 1974 by Roy Harper.

History
The album's liner notes state the tracks were "recorded at various concerts in England at one time or another". Two of the songs were recorded on Valentine's Day at a concert to mark the release of Harper's 1974 album Valentine. That concert took place at London's Rainbow Theatre where Harper performed alongside Jimmy Page, John Bonham, David Bedford, Max Middleton, Ronnie Lane and Keith Moon.

The initial printing of the album cover caused a strike among female workers at the EMI factory in Hayes when shop stewards found the picture of a naked man in that week's new releases. The naked man is Harper himself, wearing a pair of football socks in the colours of his favourite football team, Manchester City F.C.

In 1989 the album was reissued on Awareness Records. The track list was slightly altered so the album would fit onto a single CD. As a result, three tracks — "Home" (Studio version), "Too Many Movies", and "Home" — were appended onto the 1989 Awareness' reissue of Harper's 1974 release Valentine.

Track listing
All tracks credited to Roy Harper

Side one - "Easy Listening"
"Home (Studio version)
"Commune"
"Don't You Grieve"
"Twelve Hours of Sunset"
"Kangaroo Blues"

Side two - "Middle of the Road"
"All Ireland"
"Me and My Woman"
"South Africa"

Side three - "Interference (courtesy Nick Webb)"
"Highway Blues"
"One Man Rock & Roll Band"

Side four - "The Great Divider"
"Another Day"
"M.C.P. Blues"
"Too Many Movies"
"Home"

Track list on 1989 CD reissue
"Commune"
"Don't You Grieve"
"Twelve Hours of Sunset"
"Kangaroo Blues"
"All Ireland"
"Me and My Woman"
"South Africa"
"Highway Blues"
"One Man Rock & Roll Band"
"Another Day"
"M.C.P. Blues"

Personnel
Ian Tilbury - presenter
John Leckie - engineer

References

Roy Harper (singer) live albums
1974 live albums
Albums produced by Peter Jenner
Harvest Records live albums
Chrysalis Records live albums
Albums with cover art by Hipgnosis